The i-mate 810-F is quad-band Internet-enabled Windows Mobile smartphone. Its name comes from the US military standards for environment tests, MIL-STD-810. I-mate claims the 810-F can withstand temperature extremes of up to 60 degrees and -20 degrees Celsius. It is also waterproofed to 1 metre, and shockproof.

It has a rubber exterior, with a filter over the earpiece to maintain waterproofing. Metal screws are exposed so you can check the factory seals have been maintained, and there is a small plastic stylus located in a slot at the back of the phone. The 810-F features a QWERTY-keyboard, a 2.45-inch 320×240 pixel touchscreen and a five-way clickable navigation pad.

It runs the Windows Mobile 6.1 Professional operating system, with Internet Explorer 6. It offers a digital compass, A-GPS features and a three-axis accelerometer. There is also a 2MP fixed focus camera and 2 GB of storage space. There's no microSD slot to maintain its environmental coherence. Connectivity includes GSM, GPRS, EDGE, UMTS and HSDPA, plus Wi-Fi and Bluetooth 2.0.

I-mate provides a lifetime guarantee for the 810-F (subject to warranty terms and conditions, registration and annual service plan).

References

External links 
i-mate official website
Photo gallery at Pocket-lint
Mobile World Congress photo gallery at Pocket Picks

Smartphones
Windows Mobile
Mobile phones introduced in 2009